The Grand Prix de Littérature Policière (or the Police Literature Grand Prize) is a French literary prize founded in 1948 by author and literary critic Maurice-Bernard Endrèbe.  It is the most prestigious award for crime and detective fiction in France. Two prizes are awarded annually to the best French novel and to the best international crime novel published in that year.

French Prize

1940s
 1948 – Le Cinquième procédé by Léo Malet
 1949 – La Parole est au mort by Odette Sorensen (fr)

1950s
 1950 – Jeux pour mourir by Géo-Charles Véran (fr)
 1951 – Fumées sans feu by Jacques Decrest et Germaine Decrest (fr)
 1952 – Passons la monnaie by André Piljean (fr)
 1953 – Opération Odyssée by Jean-Pierre Conty (fr)
 1954 – La Beauté qui meurt by François Brigneau 
 1955 – Assassin mon frère by Gilles-Maurice Dumoulin (fr)
 1956 – Pleins feux sur Sylvie by Michel Lebrun (fr) and Les Petites mains de la Justice by Guy Venayre (fr)
 1957 – Le Bourreau pleure by Frédéric Dard
 1958 – On n'enterre pas le dimanche by Fred Kassak (fr)
 1959 – Deuil en rouge by Paul Gerrard

1960s
 1960 – The Praying Mantises by Hubert Monteilhet
 1962 – Le Procès du Diable by Pierre Forquin (fr)
 1963 – Trap for Cinderella by Sébastien Japrisot
 1964 – La Jeune morte by Michel Carnal (fr)
 1965 – Bâteau en Espagne by Marc Delory (fr)
 1966 – L'interne de service by Laurence Oriol (fr)
 1967 – Le Crocodile est dans l'escalier by Jean-Pierre Alem (fr)
 1968 – Un beau monstre by Dominique Fabre
 1969 – Drôle de pistolet by Francis Ryck

1970s
 1970 – Zigzags by Paul Andréota
 1971 – L'Assassin maladroit by 
 1972 – Le Canal rouge by 
 1973 – O Dingos, O Châteaux by Jean-Patrick Manchette
 1974 – De 5 à 7 avec la mort by André-Paul Duchâteau
 1975 – Un incident indépendant de notre volonté by 
 1976 – Les Sirènes de minuit by Jean-François Coatmeur
 1977 – La Plus longue course d'Abraham Coles, chauffeur de taxi by Christopher Diable
 1978 – Dénouement avant l'aube by Madeleine Coudray
 1979 – Le Salon du prêt à saigner by

1980s
 1980 – Le Crime d'Antoine by Dominique Roulet (fr)
 1981 – Reflets changeants sur mare de sang, L'Unijambiste de la côte 284, and Aime le maudit by Pierre Siniac
 1982 – L'Audience solennelle by Jean-Pierre Cabannes (fr)
 1983 – Collabo song by Jean Mazarin (fr)
 1984 – Sur la terre comme au ciel by René Belletto
 1985 – Meurtres pour mémoire by Didier Daeninckx
 1986 – La queue du scorpion by Christian Gernigon (fr)
 1986 – N'oubliez pas l'artiste by Gérard Delteil (fr)
 1987 – Trois morts au soleil by Jacques Sadoul
 1988 – Aix abrupto by Jean-Paul Demure (fr)
 1989 – Un gros besoin d'amour by Tito Topin (fr)

1990s
 1990 – Billard à l'étage by Michel Quint
 1991 – Hôpital souterrain by Hervé Jaouen (fr)
 1992 – La Commedia des ratés by Tonino Benacquista
 1993 – Boulevard des ombres by Paul Couturiau (fr)
 1994 – Tiré à part by Jean-Jacques Fiechter (fr)
 1995 – La Main morte by Philippe Huet (fr)
 1996 – Ambernave by Jean-Hugues Oppel (fr)
 1997 – La Mort des bois by Brigitte Aubert
 1998 – Sans homicide fixe by Serge Gardebled (fr)
 1999 – La Paresse de Dieu by Laurent Bénégui (fr)

2000s
 2000 – Du bruit sous le silence by Pascal Dessaint (fr)
 2001 – Chasseurs de têtes by Michel Crespy (fr)
 2002 – Les Brouillards de la Butte by Patrick Pécherot (fr)
 2003 – L'Ivresse des dieux by Laurent Martin (fr)
 2004 – Double peine by Virginie Brac (fr)
 2004 – Les Silences de Dieu by Gilbert Sinoue
 2005 – Le Testament de Dieu by Philippe Le Roy (fr)
 2006 – La Colère des enfants déchus by Catherine Fradier (fr)
 2007 – Citoyens clandestins by DOA (fr)
 2008 – Zulu by Caryl Férey (fr)
 2009 – Les Cœurs déchiquetés by Hervé Le Corre (fr)

2010s
 2010 – Adieu Jérusalem by Alexandra Schwartzbrod (fr)
 2011 – L’Honorable Société by DOA  (fr) and Dominique Manotti (fr)
 2012 – Arab jazz by Karim Miské (fr)
 2013 – Des nœuds d'acier by Sandrine Collette (fr)
 2014 – Pur by Antoine Chainas (fr)
 2015 – Derrière les panneaux, il y a des hommes by Joseph Incardona
 2016 – Un trou dans la toile by Luc Chomarat
 2017 – La Daronne by Hannelore Cayre
 2018 – L'été circulaire by Marion Brunet
 2019 – Le Cherokee by Richard Morgiève
 2020 – La fabrique de la terreur by Frédéric Paulin

International Prize

1940s
1948 – The Bellamy Trial by Frances Noyes Hart (USA, 1927)
1949 – Puzzle for Pilgrims by Patrick Quentin (USA, 1947)

1950s
1950 – After Midnight by Martha Albrand (USA, 1948)
1951 – The Red Right Hand by Joel Townsley Rogers (USA, 1945)
1952 – Follow as the Night by Patricia McGerr (USA, 1951)
1953 – The End is Known by Geoffrey Holiday Hall (USA, 1949)
1953 – Horns for the Devil by  Louis Malley (USA, 1951)
1954 – The Body in Grant's Tomb (short story) by Cornell Woolrich (USA, 1943)
1955 – Death in Captivity by  Michael Gilbert (UK, 1952)
1956 – The Desperate Hours by Joseph Hayes (USA, 1954)
1956 – Nothing in Her Way by Charles Williams (USA, 1953)
1957 – The Talented Mr. Ripley by Patricia Highsmith (USA, 1955)
1958 – The Five Cornered Square by Chester Himes (USA, 1956)
1959 – Orders to Kill by Donald Downes (USA, 1958)

1960s
1960 – The Evil of the Day by Thomas Sterling (UK, 1955)
1961 – no prize awarded
1962 – The Green Stone by Suzanne Blanc (USA, 1961)
1963 – The Ballad of the Running Man by Shelley Smith (UK, 1961)
1964 – A Key to the Suite by John D. MacDonald (USA, 1963)
1965 – Gun before Butter by Nicolas Freeling (UK, 1963)
1966 – The Berlin Memorandum by Adam Hall (UK, 1965)
1967 – I Start Counting by Audrey Erskine Lindop (UK, 1966)
1968 – Traitors to All (Traditori di tutti) by Giorgio Scerbanenco (Italy, 1966)
1969 – The Daughter of Time by Josephine Tey (UK, 1951)
1969 – Fire, Burn! by John Dickson Carr (USA, 1957)

1970s
1970 – The Flaw (To Lathos) by Antonis Samarakis (Greece, 1965)
1971 – Hit and Run, Run, Run (Hændeligt uheld) by Anders Bodelsen (Denmark, 1968)
1971 – The Ledger by Dorothy Uhnak (USA, 1970)
1972 – The Children Are Watching by Laird Koenig & Peter L. Dixon (USA, 1970)
1973 – Millie by E. V. Cunningham (USA, 1973)
1974 – Mirror, Mirror on the Wall by Stanley Ellin (USA, 1972)
1975 – The Dark Number by Edward Boyd & Roger Parkes (UK, 1973)
1976 – Doctor Frigo by Eric Ambler (UK, 1974)
1977 – City of the Death by Herbert Lieberman (USA, 1976)
1978 – And on the Eighth Day by Ellery Queen (USA, 1964)
1979 – The Chain of Chance (Katar) by Stanisław Lem (Poland, 1975)

1980s
1980 – A Stranger is Watching by Mary Higgins Clark (USA, 1977)
1981 – The South Seas by Manuel Vázquez Montalbán (Spain, 1979)
1982 – Party of the Year by John Crosby (USA, 1982)
1983 – No Comebacks by Frederick Forsyth (UK, 1982)
1984 – The Maine Massacre by Janwillem Van de Wetering (USA, 1979)
1985 – Swing, Swing Together by Peter Lovesey (UK, 1976)
1986 – City Primeval by Elmore Leonard (USA, 1980)
1987 – Dance Hall of the Dead by Tony Hillerman (USA, 1974)
1988 – A Taste for Death by P. D. James (UK, 1986)
1988 – Strega by Andrew Vachss (USA, 1987)
1989 – Snowbound by Bill Pronzini (USA, 1974)

1990s
1990 – A Great Deliverance by Elizabeth George (USA, 1988)
1991 – The Silence of the Lambs by Thomas Harris (USA, 1988)
1992 – Black Cherry Blues by James Lee Burke (USA, 1989)
1993 – The Flanders Panel by Arturo Pérez-Reverte (Spain, 1990)
1994 – Cabal by Michael Dibdin (UK, 1992)
1995 – Degree of Guilt by Richard North Patterson (USA, 1993)
1996 – The Alienist by Caleb Carr (USA, 1994)
1997 – Imperfect Strangers by Stuart Woods (USA, 1995)
1998 – Shadow Play by Frances Fyfield (UK, 1993)
1999 – Blood Work by Michael Connelly (USA, 1998)

2000s
2000 – River of Darkness by Rennie Airth (South Africa, 1999)
2001 – In a Dry Season by Peter Robinson (Canada, 1999)
2002 – One Foot in the Grave by Peter Dickinson (UK, 1979)
2003 – Dead before Dying by Deon Meyer (South Africa, 1999)
2004 – The Analyst by John Katzenbach (USA, 2002)
2005 – Dead Souls by Ian Rankin (UK, 1999)
2006 – The Librarian by Larry Beinhart (USA, 2004)
2007 – Voices by Arnaldur Indriðason (Röddin, Iceland, 2003)
2008 – The Ice Princess by Camilla Läckberg (Isprinsessan, Sweden, 2002)
2009 – Priest by Ken Bruen (UK, 2006)

2010s
2010 – Twilight by William Gay (2006)
2011 – Limassol by Yishai Sarid (2009)
2012 – The Devil All The Time by Donald Ray Pollock (2011)
2013 – The Killer Is Dying by James Sallis (2011) 
2014 – The Cove by Ron Rash (2012)
2015 – Un millón de gotas by Víctor del Árbol (2014)
2016 – Perro muerto by Boris Quercia (2015)
2017 – Sanning med modifikation by Sara Lövestam (Sweden, 2015)
2018 – No Tomorrow by Jake Hinkson (USA, 2015)
2019 – Green Sun by Kent Anderson (USA, 2018)
2020 – Bearskin by James A. McLaughlin (2018)

References 

French fiction awards
Mystery and detective fiction awards
Awards established in 1948
1948 establishments in France